New Finance Bank (NFB), whose complete name is New Finance Bank Malawi Limited is a commercial bank in Malawi. It is one of the commercial banks licensed by the Reserve Bank of Malawi, the central bank and national banking regulator.

Location
The bank's headquarters and main branch are located in Mwai House, at 13/112 Independence Drive, in the central business district  of the city of Lilongwe, the capital and administrative headquarters of Malawi. The geographical coordinates of New Finance Bank headquarters are: 13°57'45.2"S, 33°47'47.3"E (Latitude:-13.962500; Longitude:33.796389).

Overview
The bank received a banking licence from the Reserve Bank of Malawi on 13 May 2014 and began commercial transactions on 24 July 2014. New Finance Bank Malawi Limited has one subsidiary, NFB Forex Bureau, where it maintains 100 percent ownership. The bank serves all members of society, with special focus on those who are financially under-served.

Branches
, New Finance Bank maintained six networked branches and eleven automated teller machines, including at the following locations:

 Lilongwe Old Town Branch: CIL House, Lilongwe
 Lilongwe City Centre Branch: Mwai House, Independence Drive, City Centre, Lilongwe (Main Branch)
 Gateway Mall Branch: Gateway Mall, City Centre, Lilongwe
 Blantyre Branch: Median House, Opposite Malawi Stock Exchange, Victoria Avenue, Blantyre
 Limbe Branch: City Plaza Building, Limbe
 Dzaleka Branch:  Dzaleka Refugee Camp, Dowa

Ownership
, the stock of the bank, was owned by the following entities:

See also
 List of banks in Malawi
 Reserve Bank of Malawi
 Economy of Malawi

References

External links
 Website of New Finance Bank
 Website of Reserve Bank of Malawi

Banks of Malawi
Banks established in 2014
2014 establishments in Malawi
Lilongwe